The murder of Kirsty Jones, a British national on holiday in Thailand, took place in 2000. Jones was found raped and strangled on 10 August in her hotel room in Chiang Mai. The case, which received widespread national and overseas press coverage, went unsolved and was officially closed on the day of the 20th anniversary of the murder when the statute of limitations expired in 2020. According to Thai law twenty years is the expiring time for the statute of limitations. Jones' killer has not been identified and no one has been charged with her murder.

See also
 Cold case
 List of unsolved murders

References

External links
 Contemporary BBC News article pertaining to the murder of Kirsty Jones
 2020 ITV News article detailing the closure of the police investigation into Jones's murder

Kirsty Jones
British people murdered abroad
Female murder victims
Murder of Kirsty Jones 
Tourist murders in Thailand
Kirsty Jones